Nannodiella nana is a species of sea snail, a marine gastropod mollusk in the family Clathurellidae.

Description

Distribution
This species occurs in the Gulf of California, Western Mexico.

References

nana
Gastropods described in 1919